A white paper is a report or guide that informs readers concisely about a complex issue and presents the issuing body's philosophy on the matter. It is meant to help readers understand an issue, solve a problem, or make a decision. A white paper is the first document researchers should read to better understand a core concept or idea.

The term originated in the 1920s to mean a type of position paper or industry report published by some department of the UK government. 

Since the 1990s, this type of document has proliferated in business. Today, a business-to-business (B2B) white paper is closer to a marketing presentation, a form of content meant to persuade customers and partners and promote a certain product or viewpoint. That makes B2B white papers a type of grey literature.

In government 
The term white paper originated with the British government and many point to the Churchill White Paper of 1922 as the earliest well-known example under this name. In the British government, a white paper is usually the less extensive version of the so-called blue book, both terms being derived from the colour of the document's cover.

White papers are a "tool of participatory democracy ... not [an] unalterable policy commitment". "White papers have tried to perform the dual role of presenting firm government policies while at the same time inviting opinions upon them."

In Canada, a white paper is "a policy document, approved by Cabinet, tabled in the House of Commons and made available to the general public". The "provision of policy information through the use of white and green papers can help to create an awareness of policy issues among parliamentarians and the public and to encourage an exchange of information and analysis. They can also serve as educational techniques."

White papers are a way the government can present policy preferences before it introduces legislation. Publishing a white paper tests public opinion on controversial policy issues and helps the government gauge its probable impact.

By contrast, green papers, which are issued much more frequently, are more open-ended. Also known as consultation documents, green papers may merely propose a strategy to implement in the details of other legislation, or they may set out proposals on which the government wishes to obtain public views and opinion.

Examples of governmental white papers include, in Australia, the White Paper on Full Employment and, in the United Kingdom, the White Paper of 1939 and the 1966 Defence White Paper.

In Israeli history, the British White Paper of 1939 marking a sharp turn against Zionism in British policy and at the time greeted with great anger by the Jewish Yishuv community in Mandatory Palestine is remembered as "The White Paper" (in Hebrew Ha'Sefer Ha'Lavan  literally "The White Book").

In business-to-business marketing 
Since the early 1990s, the terms "white paper" or "whitepaper" have been applied to documents used as marketing or sales tools in business. These white papers are long-form content designed to promote the products or services from a specific company. As a marketing tool, these papers use selected facts and logical arguments to build a case favorable to the company sponsoring the document.

B2B (business-to-business) white papers are often used to generate sales leads, establish thought leadership, make a business case, grow email lists, grow audiences, increase sales, or inform and persuade readers. The audiences for a B2B white paper can include prospective customers, channel partners, journalists, analysts, investors, or any other stakeholders.

White papers are considered to be a form of content marketing or inbound marketing; in other words, sponsored content available on the web with or without registration, intended to raise the visibility of the sponsor in search engine results and build web traffic. Many B2B white papers argue that one particular technology, product, ideology, or methodology is superior to all others for solving a specific business problem. They may also present research findings, list a set of questions or tips about a certain business issue, or highlight a particular product or service from a vendor. 

There are, essentially, three main types of commercial white papers:
Backgrounder: Describes the technical or business benefits of a certain vendor's offering; either a product, service, or methodology. This type of white paper is best used to supplement a product launch, argue a business case, or support a technical evaluation at the bottom of the sales funnel or the end of the customer journey. This is the least challenging type to produce, since much of the content is readily available in-house at the sponsor. 
Numbered list: Presents a set of tips, questions, or points about a certain business issue. This type is best used to get attention with new or provocative views, or cast aspersions on competitors. Also called a listicle this is the fastest type to create; a numbered list can often be devised from a single brainstorming session, and each item can be presented as an isolated point, not part of any step-by-step logical argument. 
Problem/solution: Recommends a new, improved solution to a nagging business problem. This type is best used to generate leads at the top of the sales funnel or the start of the customer journey, build mind share, or inform and persuade stakeholders, building trust and credibility in the subject. This is the most challenging type to produce, since it requires research gathered from third-party sources and used as proof points in building a logical argument.

While a numbered list may be combined with either other type, it is not workable to combine a backgrounder with a problem/solution white paper. While a backgrounder looks inward at the details of one particular product or service, a problem/solution looks outward at an industry-wide problem. This is rather like the difference between looking through a microscope and looking through a telescope.

Variants
Several variations on the colour theme exist:
 The green paper is a proposal or consultative document rather than being authoritative or final.

Two others are much less well established:
 A blue paper sets out technical specifications of a technology or item of equipment.
 A yellow paper is a document containing research that has not yet been formally accepted or published in an academic journal. It is synonymous with the more widely used term preprint.

See also 
Research paper
Blue book
 Case study
 Green paper
 Grey literature
 Persuasive writing

References

Further reading

External links
White paper – EU glossary

Promotion and marketing communications
Technical communication
 
Grey literature